László Fitos (born 27 February 1987 in Budapest) is a Hungarian football player who plays for Gyirmót SE.

References 
Player profile at HLSZ 

1987 births
Living people
Footballers from Budapest
Hungarian footballers
Association football midfielders
Hungary youth international footballers
Budapest Honvéd FC players
Ferencvárosi TC footballers
Szolnoki MÁV FC footballers
Gyirmót FC Győr players
Kozármisleny SE footballers
Nemzeti Bajnokság I players